

A pay scale (also known as a salary structure) is a system that determines how much an employee is to be paid as a wage or salary, based on one or more factors such as the employee's level, rank or status within the employer's organization, the length of time that the employee has been employed, and the difficulty of the specific work performed. Examples of pay scales include U.S. uniformed services pay grades, the salary grades by which United States military personnel are paid, and the General Schedule, the salary grades by which United States white-collar civil service personnel are paid. Private employers use salary structures with grades (including minimums, midpoints and maximums) to define the ranges of pay available to employees in each grade/range.

Basic Pay Scale (BPS)
The term Basic Pay Scale (BPS) is used in Pakistan's government departments and public sector organizations to refer to the pay scale or grade of an official or incumbent.

See also
Open compensation plan, having pay scale openly shared

References
 

Wages and salaries